Sun Long (born 28 August 2000) is a Chinese short track speed skater. He competed in the 2019 World Junior Short Track Speed Skating Championships, winning a gold and silver medal. At the 2019 World Short Track Speed Skating Championships, Sun won a silver medal. He then competed at the 2020 World Junior Short Track Speed Skating Championships, winning a gold and bronze medal. Sun competed at the 2022 Winter Olympics.

References

External links
Sun Long at ISU

2000 births
Living people
Chinese male short track speed skaters
Olympic short track speed skaters of China
Sportspeople from Jilin
Short track speed skaters at the 2022 Winter Olympics
21st-century Chinese people